Márton Gyurján (born 1 May 1995) is a Hungarian football player who plays for Zalaegerszeg.

His brother Bence is a footballer too.

External links
HLSZ

1995 births
People from Nyíregyháza
Sportspeople from Szabolcs-Szatmár-Bereg County
Living people
Hungarian footballers
Szombathelyi Haladás footballers
Zalaegerszegi TE players
Association football goalkeepers
Nemzeti Bajnokság I players
Nemzeti Bajnokság II players